Nassim Boujellab (born 20 June 1999) is a professional footballer who plays as a midfielder for  club Schalke 04. Born in Germany, Boujellab represents the Morocco national team.

Club career
Boujellab made his professional debut for Schalke 04 in the Bundesliga on 31 March 2019, coming on as a substitute in the 79th minute for Suat Serdar in the 1–0 away win against Hannover 96.

On 25 July 2021, he joined 2. Bundesliga club Ingolstadt 04 on a one-year loan deal. On 23 January 2022, his loan contract with Ingolstadt was terminated with immediate effect because, according to the club, he "repeatedly violated internal club and team rules and regulations".

On 1 March 2022, Boujellab joined HJK in Finland on loan. He became temporarily ineligible to play for HJK early in July 2022, as HJK originally acquired him on a "sub-loan" from FC Ingolstadt, who earlier loaned him from Schalke until 30 June 2022. When that date was reached, his rights automatically reverted to Schalke and Schalke could only transfer him back on loan to HJK when the international transfer window re-opened on 13 July.

International career
Boujellab was born in Germany, and is of Moroccan descent holding dual citizenship. Boujellab was called up to the Morocco under-23 national team for the first time in September 2018. He made his under-23 debut in October 2018, making two appearances in friendly matches against Algeria. He represented the Morocco national team in a friendly 3–1 win over Senegal on 9 October 2020.

Career statistics

Club

International

Honours
HJK
Veikkausliiga: 2022

References

External links
 
 

Living people
1999 births
German people of Moroccan descent
Sportspeople from Hagen
Moroccan footballers
German footballers
Footballers from North Rhine-Westphalia
Association football midfielders
Morocco international footballers
Morocco youth international footballers
Bundesliga players
2. Bundesliga players
Veikkausliiga players
FC Schalke 04 II players
FC Schalke 04 players
FC Ingolstadt 04 players
Helsingin Jalkapalloklubi players
Moroccan expatriate footballers
Moroccan expatriate sportspeople in Finland
Expatriate footballers in Finland